The Territorial Defense Brigade Joakim Rakovac was a military unit of the Yugoslavian Territorial Defence Force of the Yugoslav Armed Forces. The brigade was based in Istria, now Croatia. During the Croatian War of Independence, personnel from the unit was used to create the HV 119th Brigade.

References

Brigades of Yugoslavia
Military units and formations of the Croatian War of Independence
Military installations of Yugoslavia